"Come Back Home" is a song by American actress and singer Sofia Carson. It was released through Hollywood Records on July 12, 2022, as the lead single from the soundtrack to the 2022 Netflix film Purple Hearts. It was written by Carson, Daniel Crean, Eren Cannata, Skyler Stonestreet and Justin Tranter.

Background
While writing "Come Back Home", Carson told Billboard that they wrote two different versions, but went with the one that is used in the film. "And once we did, we just fell in love with it. And we knew that, that was our song. It just really captured the soul, the tenderness of this moment, the vulnerability at this moment — and truly the heart of our story." There are two different versions on the soundtrack, the other being a stripped down version of the song.

Music videos
There are two music videos for "Come Back Home", both of which are featured on the soundtrack. The first was released on August 3, 2022. It shows Carson at her piano on a beach with a few clips from the film being shown. She told Entertainment Weekly, "we wanted to make it that much more special by, instead of it being a classic music video, it's a performance video," Carson explains. "So, it's me performing 'Come Back Home' on the piano and it's actually set at the same beach that Luke and I end the movie on, which makes it that much more beautiful and true to our story.

The second version of the music video shows the full performance for the song that was shown in the film while performing live in Oceanside, CA outside the gates of Camp Pendleton. It also features clips from the film throughout the video.

Charts

Weekly charts

Year-end charts

Certifications

References

2022 singles
2022 songs
Hollywood Records singles
Songs written by Justin Tranter
Songs written for films
Songs written by Skyler Stonestreet
Sofia Carson songs
Songs written by Sofia Carson